69th meridian may refer to:

69th meridian east, a line of longitude east of the Greenwich Meridian
69th meridian west, a line of longitude west of the Greenwich Meridian